Geelong Airport  was a small airfield specifically for light aircraft located in Mount Duneed, Victoria, Australia. It was primarily used for scenic flights and private aircraft, and was located in the local government area of the City of Greater Geelong.

The airport contained two gravel/tarmac runways: north/south and east/west. Though commercial airlines had attempted to fly services to Geelong in the past, they chose to use the more developed airport at Avalon, located to the north side of  Melbourne. Operations from Avalon also proved to be unsuccessful. Other airports in the area are at Barwon Heads , the Torquay Airport and the Tiger Moth World at 325 Blackgate Rd.

The site is also used to record wind and weather measurements for the area. Geelong airport was sold to property developers to allow for the expansion of the urban sprawl of Geelong. The airport closed on 31 December 2011.

Since 2011 closure and later redevelopment, only the former office building and a hangar remained. While the hangar has been retained for future use, the office building, although repainted, was allowed to decay and became a target for vandalism. On the 10th September 2022, a suspicious fire damaged the office building beyond repair. They were demolished a month later.

See also
 List of airports in Victoria
 Transportation in Australia

References

Transport in Geelong
Defunct airports in Victoria (Australia)